The Grant County Courthouse is an historic building located at Park Avenue and Main Street in Milbank, South Dakota. It was built in 1915 in the Classical Revival style and was designed by architects Bell & Bentley of Minneapolis, who also designed the South Dakota State Capitol in Pierre.

On February 10, 1993, it was added to the National Register of Historic Places.

References

County courthouses in South Dakota
Buildings and structures in Grant County, South Dakota
Courthouses on the National Register of Historic Places in South Dakota
National Register of Historic Places in Grant County, South Dakota